Waterloo is a rural locality in the local government area (LGA) of Huon Valley in the South-east LGA region of Tasmania. The 2016 census recorded a population of 92 for the state suburb of Waterloo.

History 
Waterloo was gazetted as a locality in 1965.

Geography
The waters of the Huon River estuary form the north-eastern boundary.

Road infrastructure 
Route A6 (Huon Highway) runs through from north-west to north-east.

References

Towns in Tasmania
Localities of Huon Valley Council